Erich Maren Schlaikjer (November 22, 1905 in Newtown, Ohio – November 5, 1972) was an American geologist and dinosaur hunter. Assisting Barnum Brown, he co-described Pachycephalosaurus and what is now Montanoceratops. Other discoveries include Miotapirus and a new species of Mesohippus.

Schlaikjer attended Harvard University, where he graduated with a bachelor's degree in 1929. He received master’s and doctoral degrees from Columbia University in 1931 and in 1935, respectively.

Honors
Selected highlights of honors:
 Parmentier Scholar, Harvard University 1924 to 1925.
 University Fellow, Columbia University, 1931 to 1932.
 Cressy Morrison Prize, New York Academy of Science, 1939.
 Fellow of The Geological Society of America, 1939.
 Fellow of the Paleontological Society of America, 1940.
 Fellow of the American Association for the Advancement of Science.
 Who’s Who in America, 1949 Supplement, 1950 edition to date.

Publications

Schlaikjer EM. (1931)	Description of a new Mesohippus from the White River formation of South Dakota: New England Zool. Club Proc., 12, pp35–36.
Schlaikjer EM. (1932) The osteology of Mesohippus barbouri: Mus. Comp. Zool. Bull., 72, pp391–410.
Brown B, Schlaikjer EM. (1937) The skeleton of Styracosaurus with the description of a new species: Am. Mus. Novitates. 955 p1-12.

External links
 Erich Maren Schlaikjer website family website

References

20th-century American geologists
American paleontologists
1905 births
1972 deaths
Harvard University alumni
Columbia University alumni